Acacia newmanii is a shrub of the genus Acacia and the subgenus Plurinerves that is endemic to an area of north western Australia.

Description
The brown to red-brown branchlets are flattened or angular to the apices and are glabrous and resinous with conspicuous lenticels. It blooms between March and October.

Distribution
It is found in the Kimberley region of Western Australia and the western part of the top end of the Northern Territory. The range of the pant extends from around Kalumburu in the north west down to around the Gibb River Road in the south west and across into the Northern Territory to around Blunder Bay on the Victoria River in the north east to around the Keep River National Park in the east. It can be situated on flats, rocky hills or gorges along watercourses growing in gravelly or sandy soils over or around quartzite or sandstone as a part of savannah woodland or savannah grassland communities where it is usually associated with spinifex.

See also
List of Acacia species

References

newmanii
Acacias of Western Australia
Flora of the Northern Territory
Taxa named by Mary Tindale